Denton Lotz (January 18, 1939 – April 23, 2019) was the general secretary of the Baptist World Alliance from 1988 to 2007 and the senior pastor of Tremont Temple Baptist Church in Boston from 2007 to 2017.

Biography 
Lotz held a bachelor of sacred theology degree from Harvard Divinity School and a doctor of theology degree from the University of Hamburg. He was married to Janice Lotz.

Ministry
In 1988, he became the general secretary of the Baptist World Alliance until 2007.  In 2007, he became the senior pastor of Tremont Temple Baptist Church in Boston until 2017.

References

1939 births
2019 deaths
American people of German descent
Baptist ministers from the United States
Harvard Divinity School alumni
University of Hamburg alumni